Weiser Fulop (Fülöp, Pinchas) was a famous chief Hazan-Cantor (synagogue)
() of Nyíregyháza, Hungary.

He was born in 1879 in Zemplén County, Stropkov district in Hungary. He also was the Hazan at Rumbach Street synagogue in Budapest.

His songs appeared in records between 1908 to 1910.

Thanks to a contribution by George Soros, two of his most famous songs, El male rachamim and Rosh Hashanah appeared on a CD (#15 and #16) - "Jewish Cantorial Music from Hungary 1906-1929".

He was murdered during World War II on February 2, 1940.

Weiser Fulop left five sons (Adolf, Izso, Alexander-Shlomo, Jancsi-Jacob, Dezso) and three daughters (Frici, Bozsi, Magda).

Adolf died in a Siberian labor camp; his brother Alexander-Shlomo, who was with him at the camp, escaped and went back to Budapest, Hungary in 1945.

Except Dezso, who stayed in Hungary with his family, all the others immigrated to Israel with their families between 1949 and 1956.

Dr. Giora Ram (Weiser) is his grandson, Alexander-Shlomo Weiser's son.

References

External links
  Jewish Cantorial records from the Austro-Hungarian period (in Hungarian)
 Records sorted by title
 Records sorted by name
 "Boi Bscholom" Voices from a lost world
 Musical treasures - "Nagy magyar kántorok 1910-1948" - Great Hungarian Cantors 1910-1948
 WEISER FÜLÖP nyíregyházi izraelita főkántor ma tartja hangversenyét az izraelita hitközség dísztermében - A musical competition in 1930 held by WEISER FÜLÖP, the chief Cantor of Nyíregyháza

1879 births
1940 deaths
Jewish services
Hungarian Jews
Hazzans